Avanti is a brand of kart chassis marketed in the US and Central America by JM Racing (of Carson, California) but built in Italy by Parolin. Avanti has a full line of karts including; TaG, Shifter, 100 cc, Cadet, 4-Cycle and Baby.

Introduced in November 2002, Avanti competed in West Coast 2003 Stars of Tomorrow Series, with driver; Andrew Alfonso, Billy Johnson, Sean Neilson, Sebastian Andrade, Scott Meadow, Tibor Kellmen and Mathias Calderon. Alfonso won 2-races on his way to second in the ICA championship.

Avanti has also dominated go kart racing in Guatemala and El Salvador since 2004. In 2005 the Avanti won 4 Duffy's in the 2-Cycle Grandnational Championships at Moran Raceway, in Beaumont California.

External links 

JM Racing Official website  (appears defunct)
Parolin Official website (Italy)
Parolin Racing Official website (UK - English)

Kart manufacturers of Italy